All I Need is the first extended play (EP) by Polish singer Margaret released on 30 July 2013 by Extensive Music and Magic Records, only in Poland. It yielded two singles, "Thank You Very Much" released on 21 February 2013, and "Tell Me How Are Ya" released on 4 July 2013. All songs from the EP were included on Margaret's 2014 debut studio album Add the Blonde.

All I Need peaked at number 50 on the Polish Albums Chart.

Track listing

Charts

Release history

References

2013 EPs
Margaret (singer) albums